= The Leavenworth Advocate =

African-American weekly newspaper

Leavenworth Advocate
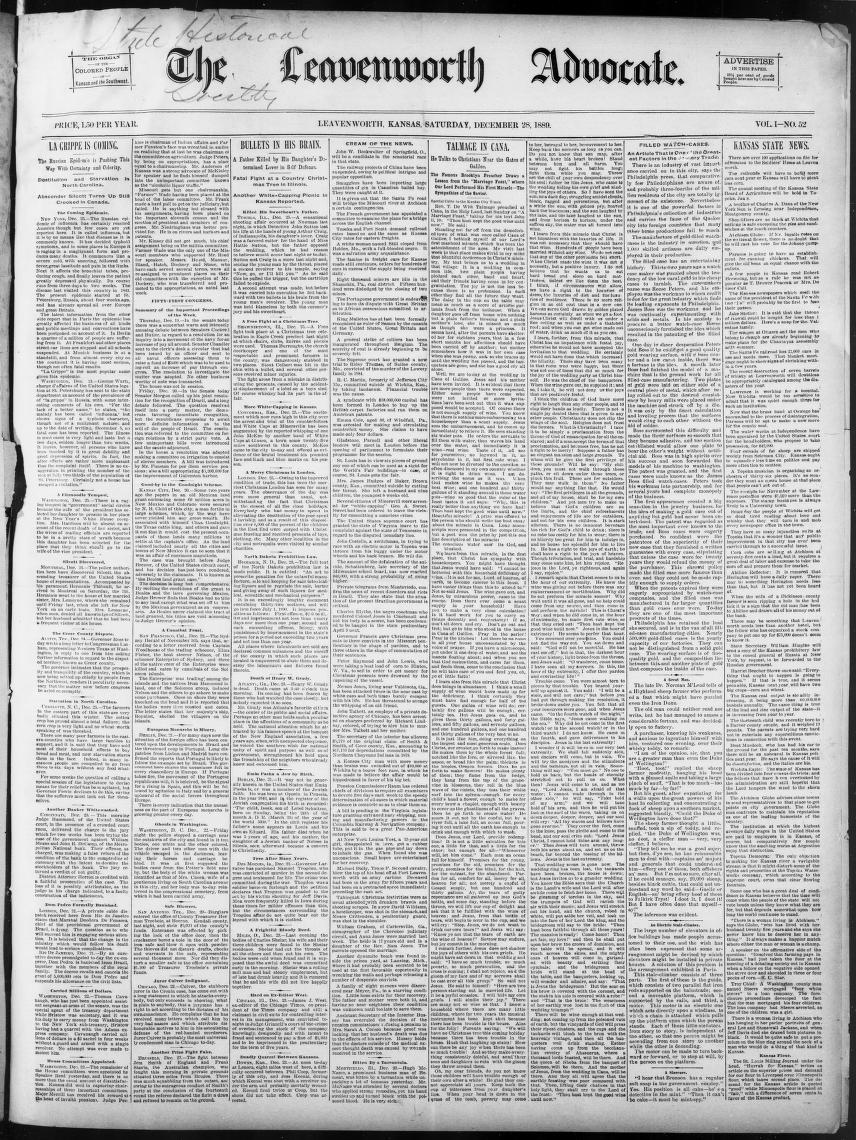
- Leavenworth Advocate, December 28, 1889
- Type: Weekly newspaper
- Format: Broadsheet
- Editor: W. B. Townsend
- Founded: September 21, 1889
- Ceased publication: August 22, 1891
- City: Leavenworth, Kansas
- Country: United States

The Leavenworth Advocate was an African-American weekly newspaper based in Leavenworth, Kansas that was established in 1889. The newspaper mainly talked about local and national politics. It was primarily edited by W. B. Townsend throughout its publication from 1889 to 1891.

== History ==
=== Origins ===
The Leavenworth Advocate issued its first volume on September 21, 1889, where it succeeded The Advocate. The Advocate was published by Smith & Chestina and edited by N. Clark Smith. In the middle of 1889 W. B. Townsend took over editorship and soon after published under the new name of the Leavenworth Advocate.

=== 1889-1891 ===
African Americans migrated into Leavenworth and across Kansas following the end of the Civil War. Throughout Townsend's editorship The Leavenworth Advocate continued to act as "a prominent voice for the African American community, addressing issues of civil rights, political participation, education, and social advancement during the post-Reconstruction era."

=== After 1891 ===
The Leavenworth Advocate issued its last volume on August 22, 1891 whereafter it merged with Historic Times to form the Times-observer. After the merger, W. B. Townsend was no longer listed as editor.
